Biryulyovo Zapadnoye District is a territorial division (a district, or raion) in Southern Administrative Okrug, one of the 125 in the federal city of Moscow, Russia. It is located in the south of the city and borders with Biryulyovo Vostochnoye in the east, Moscow Ring Road (MKAD) in the south, Chertanovo Yuzhnoye in the west, and Chertanovo Tsentralnoye in the north-west. As of the 2010 Census, the total population of the district was 85,726.

Municipal status
As a municipal division, the district is incorporated as Biryulyovo Zapadnoye Municipal Okrug.

Economy

Transportation
The eastern border of the district is formed by a railway, and two railway stations, Biryulyovo-Tovarnaya and Biryulyovo-Passazhirskaya, are located in the district. They serve the Paveletsky suburban railway line.

See also
 2013 Biryulyovo riots

References

Notes

Sources

Districts of Moscow